Stevenson House is a historic home located at New Bern, Craven County, North Carolina.  It was built about 1805, and is a -story, three bay, side hall plan Federal style frame dwelling.  It has a two-story east wing added in 1890, and a one-story modern kitchen added in 1957.

It was listed on the National Register of Historic Places in 1971.

References

Historic American Buildings Survey in North Carolina
Houses on the National Register of Historic Places in North Carolina
Federal architecture in North Carolina
Houses completed in 1805
Houses in New Bern, North Carolina
National Register of Historic Places in Craven County, North Carolina
1805 establishments in North Carolina